Marco Veilleux (born 29 October 1962) is a Canadian former swimmer. He competed in the men's 100 metre breaststroke at the 1984 Summer Olympics.

References

External links
 

1962 births
Living people
Canadian male breaststroke swimmers
Olympic swimmers of Canada
Swimmers at the 1984 Summer Olympics
Swimmers from Montreal
Swimmers at the 1983 Pan American Games
Pan American Games medalists in swimming
Pan American Games silver medalists for Canada
Medalists at the 1983 Pan American Games